Paulo César Villar Nieto (born 28 July 1978 in Santa Marta, Magdalena) is a Colombian hurdling athlete.

At the 2006 Central American and Caribbean Games he finished second in 13.29 seconds, equalling the South American record of Brazilian Redelén dos Santos as well as establishing a new national record.

Personal bests
100 m: 10.69 s (wind: +1.4 m/s) –  Medellín, 25 April 2009
200 m: 21.29 s (wind: NWI) –  Bogotá, 13 August 2006
110 m hurdles: 13.27 s (wind: +1.6 m/s) –  Guadalajara, 28 October 2011
400 m hurdles: 50.34 s –  Trujillo, 28 November 2013

Achievements

References

External links

1978 births
Living people
Colombian male hurdlers
Athletes (track and field) at the 2004 Summer Olympics
Athletes (track and field) at the 2008 Summer Olympics
Athletes (track and field) at the 2012 Summer Olympics
Athletes (track and field) at the 2011 Pan American Games
Olympic athletes of Colombia
Sportspeople from Magdalena Department
Pan American Games medalists in athletics (track and field)
Pan American Games silver medalists for Colombia
Central American and Caribbean Games silver medalists for Colombia
Competitors at the 2002 Central American and Caribbean Games
Competitors at the 2006 Central American and Caribbean Games
Competitors at the 2010 Central American and Caribbean Games
Central American and Caribbean Games medalists in athletics
Medalists at the 2011 Pan American Games
20th-century Colombian people
21st-century Colombian people